Buenaventura (Spanish, 'good fortune', and the name of Saint Bonaventure) or Buena Ventura may refer to:

People
Buenaventura Báez (1812-1884), president of the Dominican Republic for five terms
Buenaventura Bagaria (1882–1947), a Spanish sports shooter
Buenaventura Carlos Aribau (1798–1862), a Spanish economist, writer and politician 
Buenaventura Cousiño Jorquera (1808–1855), a Chilean politician
Buenaventura de Abarzuza y Ferrer (1843–1910), a Spanish diplomat
Buenaventura Durruti (1896–1936), a Spanish anarchist and hero of the Spanish Civil War
Buenaventura Ferreira (born 1960), a Paraguayan footballer
Buenaventura Fernández de Córdoba Spínola (1724–1777), a Spanish aristocrat and priest
Buenaventura García de Paredes (1866–1936), a Dominican priest 
Buenaventura Marcó del Pont (1738–1818), a Spanish businessman
Buenaventura S. Medina Jr. (born 1928), a Filipino author
Buenaventura Rodriguez (1893–1940), Filipino playwright and politician
Buenaventura Sitjar (1739–1808), Franciscan missionary who served in California, U.S.
Buenaventura Villamayor (born 1967), a Filipino chess player
Rafael Buenaventura (1938–2006), a Filipino banker

Places
Buenaventura, Valle del Cauca, Colombia
Buenaventura, Cuba
Buenaventura, Camagüey, Cuba
Buenaventura Municipality, Chihuahua, Mexico
Buenaventura, Spain
Buenaventura Lakes, Florida, U.S.
Buenaventura Province, a former province of Gran Colombia

Other uses
 Buenaventura, a 2016 album by La Santa Cecilia
 "Buenaventura", a song by Paul van Dyk from the 2003 album Reflections
 Buenaventura River (legend), a non-existent river once believed to run from the Rocky Mountains to the Pacific Ocean
 , or USS Buenaventura, a U.S. Navy cargo ship sunk in WW1
 Buenaventura (mining company), a Peruvian mining company
 Buenaventura Press, an American publisher and distributor of comics and graphic novels

See also

San Buenaventura (disambiguation)
Buenaventura Classic, a men's professional golf tournament 

Spanish-language surnames